Losing You may refer to:

Literature
 Losing You (novel), by Nicci French (2006)

Music
 "Losing You" (Brenda Lee song) (1963)
 "Losing You" (Dead by April song) (2009)
 "Losing You" (Eiffel 65 song) (2002)
 "Losing You" (Ephixa and Laura Brehm song) (2017)
 "Losing You" (Sharon O'Neill song) (1983)
 "Losing You" (Solange song) (2012)
 "Losing You", a song by Busted from Busted (2002)
 "Losing You", a song by Dusty Springfield (1964)
 "Losing You", a song by Jeff Lynne's ELO from From Out of Nowhere (2019)
 "Losing You", a song by Milky Chance from Blossom (2017)
 "Losing You", a song by Randy Newman from Harps and Angels (2008)
 "Losing You", a song by Flo, (2022)
 "Losin' You", a song by Tim McGraw from Damn Country Music (2015)
 "Losing U", a song by Amerie from Because I Love It (2007)

See also
 I'm Losing You (disambiguation)